"The Moon Moth" is a science fiction short story by American author Jack Vance, first published in Galaxy Science Fiction (August 1961).

Plot summary
Edwer Thissell, the new consul from Earth to the planet Sirene, has trouble adjusting to the local culture.  The Sirenese cover their faces and heads with exquisitely crafted masks that indicate their social status (strakh) and mood. They also communicate by singing, accompanying themselves with one of a score of musical instruments, selected based on the social situation and feelings. Furthermore, errors of etiquette may prove fatal.  Thissell is a clumsy musician and lacks confidence in the alien society, so he is forced to wear a lowly Moon Moth mask. 

One day, he receives an alert to arrest a notorious assassin named Haxo Angmark, who is due on the next starship. Thissell, however, gets the message too late. He races to the spaceport, but Angmark, thoroughly comfortable with Sirenese customs, has already landed and disappeared. Thissell commits a number of serious social blunders in his haste to reach the spaceport and in enquiring after Angmark.

The next morning, Thissell is shown the body of an offworlder. He concludes that, since the fugitive would be unable to pass himself off as a native, Angmark must have killed and taken the place of one of the other three expatriates on the planet. But since even they wear masks, how is Thissell to know which one?

Eventually, Thissell solves the mystery by borrowing a slave from each of the suspects and determining their masters' mask preferences before and after Angmark's arrival. He succeeds in identifying his quarry, but is captured and forced to walk unmasked in public (the ultimate humiliation to the natives), while Angmark masquerades as Thissell by wearing his Moon Moth mask. However, the Sirenese turn on Angmark and kill him for the perversion of unmasking another man and, ironically, for Thissell's previous gaffes.

Thinking quickly, Thissell cleverly represents his humiliation as an act of unsurpassed bravery, asking if any present would be willing to be so shamed in order to destroy his enemy. With his new-found confidence, Thissell receives offers of gifts (the acceptance of which would enhance the prestige of both the giver and the recipient). He first goes with a mask maker to procure a covering more befitting his lofty new strakh.

Adaptations
First Second Books published a graphic novel edition by Jack Vance and illustrated by Humayoun Ibrahim in May 2012.

Translations
La Luna Sfingo, translation into Esperanto under Creative Commons licence: EPub, Mobi, PDF and MP3

References

External links

StarShipSofa serialized a narration by fiction writer and voice artist Josh Roseman in two parts on January 16 and 23, 2013
Part 1
Part 2

1961 short stories
Science fiction short stories
Short stories by Jack Vance
Works originally published in Galaxy Science Fiction
Social reputation in fiction